Choi Nak-Min (born 27 May 1989) is a South Korean footballer who plays as forward for Bucheon FC 1995 in K League Challenge.

Career
He was selected by Suwon Samsung Bluewings in the 2012 K-League draft. He moved to Bucheon FC after the season ends.

References

External links 

1989 births
Living people
Association football forwards
South Korean footballers
Suwon Samsung Bluewings players
Bucheon FC 1995 players
K League 1 players
K League 2 players